Rantau (Chinese: 晏斗) is a small town and a mukim in Seremban District, Negeri Sembilan, Malaysia.

Location
Rantau is 16 km south of downtown Seremban, 20 km ENE of Port Dickson and 49 km south-east of Kajang, Selangor.

It is surrounded by several hamlets including Kuala Sawah, Siliau, Pedas and Ayer Kuning, and is the main town in the region with facilities like banks, mini market, quick-service restaurants and a post office.

Society
The community contains five primary schools and two secondary schools.  Rantau supports a multiracial population of around 8,000 people. Former Menteri Besar, Mohamad Hasan is Rantau's representative in the State Assembly since 2004.

Rantau has many notable successful people. Among them is the former Chief Minister of Negeri Sembilan Mohamad Hasan; Dato VS Mogan former EXCO member of the Negeri Sembilan State Government; Puan Malar Rajaram a Bahasa Melayu Radio Host and Producer in Canada for 15 years who had returned to homeland and contested in the 2019 Rantau By-election; Mr Maha Sinnathamby, Rantau born Australian developer of Greater Springfield Development in Queensland, the largest master-planned community in Australia. There are few Government Diplomats, high-level civil servants and businessmen who have their origin from Rantau.

Transport
The town is basically located at a 4 road junction. Heading northbound is the Jalan Rantau-Mambau  which connects Rantau to Mambau northward and Linggi southward. Finally heading west is the Jalan Rantau-Siliau  which connects the Rantau to Siliau and Lukut at the Federal Route 53.
Although the town isn't served directly by the North-South Expressway, the closest exit is the EXIT 223 Pedas.
While Rantau isn't served by the KTM Komuter, it is a few kilometers away from Sungai Gadut station.

Nearby
The mosque in the nearby hamlet of Kuala Sawah was built by estate owner Bujai Bin Dato' Raja Matshah on a piece of land donated (waqf) by him in 1922 at the junction of Jalan Ulu Sawah. Bujai Bin Dato' Raja Matshah lived near the mosque till his death in 1924 and was buried in front of it.

Tourist attractions
 Rantau Agro Park Rantau Eko Park is closed

References 

Mukims of Negeri Sembilan
Seremban District